The sex trade consists of businesses which either directly or indirectly provide sex-related products and services.

Sex trade may also refer to:

 Russian Dolls: Sex Trade, a Flemish television programme
 "Sex Trade" (The Unit), a 2008 television episode